Hoxie High School may refer to:
 Hoxie High School (Arkansas)
 Hoxie Jr-Sr High School, Hoxie, Kansas (Hoxie Community Schools USD 412)